Leszli Kálli is a Colombian-born author who was kidnapped and held for slightly more than a year by Colombian leftist guerrillas. The diary she kept to record her experiences was published in February, 2007.

Biography
Leszli Kálli was born and raised in Bucaramanga, Colombia. On 12 April 1999, Kálli boarded a plane in Colombia to work on a kibbutz in Israel. Part-way through the trip, the plane was hijacked by a leftist guerrilla group and forced to land on an abandoned runway in the jungle. Kálli, along with her father and the other passengers, were held hostage for 373 days. During this time she kept a diary, which was made into a book, Kidnapped: A Diary of My 373 days in Captivity, that was published in February 2007. She lives in Canada under United Nations witness protection.

See also
List of kidnappings
List of solved missing person cases

Publications
 Kidnapped: A Diary of My 373 days in Captivity, Kálli's diary of her time in the jungle (published by Simon & Schuster).

References

1990s missing person cases
Canadian people of Hungarian descent
Colombian emigrants to Canada
Colombian people of Hungarian descent
Colombian women writers
Formerly missing people
Living people
Missing person cases in Colombia
Hijacking survivors
People from Bucaramanga
Women diarists
Year of birth missing (living people)